Episode or Episode Interactive is an interactive story video game developed by Pocket Gems.

The app is a storytelling network and platform that features interactive stories built for mobile devices such as smartphones and tablets. Users enter one of the stories and make choices as the storyline progresses. The product also has a user generated content creation platform that enables users to create their own stories,

Episode features three types of stories: user generated, in-house originals and IP licensed. Some IP stories include "Demi Lovato: Path to Fame", "Pretty Little Liars", "Clueless", "Pitch Perfect: In Deep Treble", "Mean Girls: Senior Year", "Mean Girls: Sorority Rush", “Home Wrecker”, "Cameron Dallas: It Started With a Lie", and "Falling For the Dolan Twins".

Gameplay and content creation 
The game is structured as a visual novel, with many stories to choose from. Players customize their character, choosing their hair, makeup, and facial features. As the player progresses through the story, they are given action and dialogue choices that can influence the plot. Featured stories have micro-transactions that allow the player to unlock premium choices using in-game currency. Players have a set number of free chapters they can read each day, after which point they must purchase story packs to read more.

Community members can also create and publish their own stories for others to view. The app has its own proprietary scripting language that is designed to help users without animation or computer programming experience.

Controversies 
Despite the app being marketed to children, many of the stories available on the Episode app feature sexually suggestive elements. User-generated stories are filtered for profanity, but this process does not eliminate sexual themes. Daniel Terry, co-founder, and chief creative officer of Pocket Gems stated in an interview that the stories are directly monitored to flag inappropriate content and that the company will "always have a monitoring system in place" as the platform increases in scale.

Online Presence 
The game became a popular meme throughout 2018 involving people creating their own picture imitating the clickbait style advertising linked with the game, while adding a slightly sinister twist. The game also picked up attention from the social media platform TikTok along with other similar apps including Mafia City, in which viewers were presented with edited versions of the adverts for the apps.

References

External links
 Official website

2010s interactive fiction
Adventure games
Android (operating system) games
iOS games
2014 video games
Video games developed in the United States